Harpenden East was one of two stations serving the town of Harpenden, the other station which remains open being Harpenden Central. Originally named Harpenden, the East suffix was added in 1950 to distinguish it from the Midland Railway station.

Layout 

The line was single track with a crossing loop at Harpenden East.

An intermediate station on the Great Northern Railway branch line between Hatfield and Dunstable Town, it opened in 1860 and closed in 1965.

Closure 

Since closure the station has been demolished and both the site and the line in the immediate area have had housing built.

Routes

See also 

 List of closed railway stations in Britain

References

External links 
 Station history and photos

Former Great Northern Railway stations
Railway stations in Great Britain opened in 1860
Railway stations in Great Britain closed in 1965
Disused railway stations in Hertfordshire
Beeching closures in England